Mirnaa is an Indian actress who acts in Malayalam, Tamil and Telugu films.

Early life 
Mirnaa (Arya Santhosh) was born in Idukki, Kerala. Her father is a businessman. She attended SHHS Ramakkalmettu in Idukki before studying a Bachelor of Engineering at St. Francis College, Chennai.

Career 
She debuted in the Tamil film industry. She was filming for the film SanthanaDevan before she was dropped after 35 days of shooting. In 2020, she starred in the Malayalam movie Big Brother opposite Mohanlal. Mirnaa is playing the lead in KM Sarjun's movie with Kalaiyarasan which is under filming. She also plays the lead in Aadi Saikumar's Crazy Fellow (2022) and in Allari Naresh's  Ugram.

Filmography

Films

Web series

References

External links 

21st-century Indian actresses
Year of birth missing (living people)
Living people
Actresses in Tamil cinema
Actresses in Telugu cinema
Actresses in Malayalam cinema